Brunswick High School may refer to several high schools in North America:

Brunswick High School (Georgia) in Brunswick, Georgia
Brunswick High School (Maine) in Brunswick, Maine
Brunswick High School (Maryland) in Brunswick, Maryland
Brunswick High School (Ohio) in Brunswick, Ohio
Brunswick High School (Virginia) in Lawrenceville, Virginia

See also
Brunswick School in Greenwich, Connecticut
East Brunswick High School in East Brunswick, New Jersey
New Brunswick High School in New Brunswick, New Jersey
North Brunswick High School in Leland, North Carolina
North Brunswick Township High School in North Brunswick, New Jersey
South Brunswick High School (New Jersey) in Monmouth Junction, New Jersey
South Brunswick High School (North Carolina) in Southport, North Carolina
Brunswick County Early College High School in Bolivia, North Carolina
Brunswick County Academy in Bolivia, North Carolina